Yasuyoshi Chiba is a Japanese photojournalist, based in Nairobi, Kenya. In 2020 he won World Press Photo of the Year.

Life and work

Chiba has worked for Agence France-Presse since 2011 and is currently its Chief Photographer for East Africa and the Indian Ocean. His photojournalism has mostly been made in Brazil and Kenya. He is based in Nairobi, Kenya.

Publications
Kenya Burning, Mgogoro Baada ya Uchaguzi 2007/8. Nairobi: GoDown Arts Centre, 2009. . With Boniface Mwangi. Edited by Billy Kahora. In English and Swahili.

Exhibitions
Football as seen through the eyes of children in Cidade de Deus favela, with Christophe Simon, Visa pour l'Image, Perpignan, France

Awards
2008: Public Prize, Bayeux Calvados-Normandy Award for war correspondents, Bayeux, France
2009: Winner, People in the News – Singles category, World Press Photo, Amsterdam
2012: Winner, People in the News – Stories category, World Press Photo, Amsterdam
2020: Winner, World Press Photo of the Year, World Press Photo, Amsterdam
2020: Winner, General News – Singles category, World Press Photo, Amsterdam

References

External links

Japanese photojournalists
Date of birth missing (living people)
Place of birth missing (living people)
Living people
Year of birth missing (living people)
Expatriate photographers in Sudan